Ellbach may refer to:

Ellbach (Kocher), a river of Baden-Württemberg, Germany, tributary of the Kocher
Ellbach (Sulm), a river of Baden-Württemberg, Germany, tributary of the Sulm
Ellbach (Rot), a river of Baden-Württemberg, Germany, headstream of the Rot
Ellbach (Saar), a river of Saarland, Germany, tributary of the Saar
Ellbach (Isar), a river of Bavaria, tributary of the Isar in Bad Tölz
Ellbach (Brandenberger Ache), a river of the Kufstein District, Austria, tributary of the Brandenberger Ache

See also
Elbach, a commune in Alsace, France
Elbbach, a river in Rhineland-Palatinate and Hesse, Germany